Joey Terrill (born 1955) is a Los Angeles based queer Chicano artist. Terrill uses inspiration from cartoons, magazines, 1950s and 1960s art movements, and comics to produce his work.

Biography 

Joey Terrill grew up a second-generation Los Angeleno in Highland Park, surrounded by art. He went to a Catholic all-boys school, where he found his interest in Chicano political movements. In 1969, Terrill became familiar with the Metropolitan Community Church (MCC) and the Stonewall Riots by reading the Los Angeles Free Press. The MCC introduced him to various members of the queer community, where he met Teddy Sandoval and Edmundo Meza. Together, they created art and participated in local activism. 

Terrill and Sandoval began a close working artistic relationship, both inspired by their queer and Chicano identities. In the late 1970s, Terrill created The Maricón Series portrait series, in which he made tee shirts with the self-descriptor "maricon" to question the word's meaning and context.

Terrill was also fascinated by painting and painted various titles including He Used to Untie My Shoes (1978), If I Were Rich, I’d Buy My Lover Expensive Gifts (1980–82), He Wore Ray Ban Glasses, a Rolex Watch, and He Used to Eat My Ass (1985).  

From 1980 to 1981, Terrill moved to New York but eventually returned home to Los Angeles. At the time, the AIDS epidemic had recently broken out, affecting his closest friends and community.  In 1989, Terrill tested positive for HIV. Overcome by the deaths surrounding him, Terrill moved to activism to aid his local community.  During this time, Terrill also focused on creating work for the Chicano gay community, such as Chicos Modernos, an AIDS educational comic book written in Spanish. Terrill's art from 1989 still reemerged almost twenty years later, such as in his piece Remembrance (For Teddy and Arnie) (2008) based on his original 1989 painting Remembrance.

After the 1990s, Terrill's work reflected his community and everyday life. He also used 35mm photography connecting memory, storytelling, and themes of persistence. 

Today, Terrill lives in Los Angeles and is the Director of Global Advocacy & Partnerships for the AIDS Healthcare Foundation.

Works and exhibitions

"Homeboy Beautiful" (1979) 
Acting as a defiance to machismo culture, Terrill wrote a zine dedicated to the representation of Chicano gay men. While only two editions and one-hundred copies sold, the zines still received cult status. In both zines, there are fashion sections with "Ask Lil Loca," sections that give popular cholo fashion advice and sections for art submissions. In the zines, Terrill wrote about "homo-homeboys" who were gang-affiliated Chicano men with internalized homophobia.

"Axis Mundo: Queer Networks in Chicano L.A." (2017) 
A partnership between The Museum of Contemporary Art, Los Angeles and Pacific Standard Time: LA/LA, Axis Mundo: Queer Networks in Chicano L.A., this exhibit combined music, art, and performances of queer Chicano/a artists in Los Angeles from the 1960s to the early 1990s. The Maricón Series (1975) and Homeboy Beautiful (1979) were featured.

"Joey Terrill: Cut and Paste" (2023) 
From January 19th to February 25th of 2023, Terrill premiered his work Cut and Paste, showcasing his collage work from the 1970s to today. The exhibition was held by The Ortuzar Projects, a gallery in Tribeca, New York. His work, using various materials, draws inspiration from Sister Corita Kent. In the middle of the gallery was a fixture of a Xerox machine called It's Halloween Party Time from the late 1990s, displaying artifacts from parties he held at the peak of the AID Crisis. Other works in the exhibit included When I Was Young (1993), Homeboy Beautiful (1979), and Here I am / Estoy Aquí (2022).

Further reading 
 Chavoya, C. Ondine, et al. Axis Mundo : Queer Networks in Chicano L.A.  / C. Ondine Chavoya, David Evans Frantz, with Macarena Gómez-Barris ; Leticia Alvarado, Julia Bryan-Wilson, Simon Doonan, Colin Gunckel, Joshua Javier Guzmán, Iván A. Ramos, Richard T. Rodríguez. ONE National Gay & Lesbian Archives at the USC Libraries, 2017.
 Pilcher, Alex. “A Queer Little History of Art” edited by Alex Pilcher. Tate Publishing division of Tate Enterprises Ltd. Millbank, London SW1P 4RG, 2017
 Terrill, Joey. “Look at Me/Mirame” in Drama Queer, curated by Jonathan D. Katz and Conor Moynihan with an introduction by SD Holman, 50-53, Vancouver, BC: Pride in Art Society, 2017. Published in conjunction with the exhibition “Drama Queer” for the Queer Arts Festival shown at the Roundhouse Arts & Recreation Centre in Vancouver, BC June 21-30, 2016
 Hernandez, Robb and Terrill, Joey “Coastal Traffic: Triangulated Encounters in Art/AIDS/Americas” In Art, AIDS, America, edited by Rock Hushka and Jonathan D. Katz, 100-110. acoma, WA: Tacoma Art Mueum;Seattle: University of Washington Press, 2015
 Hernandez, Robb. VIVA Records, 1970-2000: Lesbian and Gay Latino Artists of Los Angeles. The Chicano Archives 7. Los Angeles: UCLA Chicano Studies Research Center Press.

References

External links 
 Official Website
 Instagram